Rajkumari Haksar, (1928–2014) also known as Rajkumari Kaul, was an Indian personality.

About 
Born Rajkumari Haksar, Mrs. Kaul was a blood relation of Indira Gandhi, and a 'household member' of Indian Prime Minister Atal Bihari Vajpayee's family and the mother of Vajpayee's adopted daughter Namita. Political scientist Vinay Sitapati, in his book 'Jugalbandi: The BJP before Modi', writes "The heart of the relationship between Vajpayee and Rajkumari was intellectual. From a provincial north Indian milieu, Vajpayee was both perplexed by as well as attracted to an educated woman who could hold her own." There are also rumors' that Namita Bhattacharya, the foster daughter of Atal Bihari Vajpayee was indeed a daughter of Atal Bihari Vajpayee Vajpayee and Rajkumari Kaul and that both Atal Bihari Vajpayee and Rajkumari Kaul did not openly give a name to their relationship throughout both of their lives.

Death 
She died in May 2014. Numerous dignitaries attended her last rites including L K Advani, Rajnath Singh, Sushma Swaraj, Arun Jaitley, Ravi Shankar Prasad and Jyotiraditya Scindia. RSS pracharak Ramlal was also present. Atal Bihari Vajpayee could not attend the last rites due to ill health.

References 

1928 births
2014 deaths